The Devapiran Perumal Temple, also known as Thirutholaivillimangalam Irettai Thirupathi Sri Srinivasa Perumal Temple in Tholavillimangalam, a village in Thoothukudi district in the South Indian state of Tamil Nadu, is dedicated to the Hindu god Vishnu. It is located 22 km from Tirunelveli. Constructed in the Dravidian style of architecture, the temple is glorified in the Nalayira Divya Prabandham, the early medieval Tamil canon of the Alvar saints from the 6th–9th centuries CE. It is one of the 108 Divya Desams dedicated to Vishnu, who is worshipped as Devapiran and his consort Lakshmi as Karunthadankanni. The temple is also classified as a Nava Tirupati, the nine temples revered by Nammalvar located in the banks of Tamiraparani river. Along with the Aravindalochanar temple located 100 yards away, the temple is referred as Irattai Tirupati (meaning twin Tirupatis). This temple is a Ketu Sthalam, housing a shrine to the deity Ketu. 

A granite wall surrounds the temple, enclosing all its shrines. Unlike other South Indian temples, the temple does not have a rajagopuram, the temple's gateway tower. The Vijayanagara and Nayak kings commissioned pillared halls and major shrines of the temple during the 16th century.

Devapiran is believed to have appeared to slay the asura Somaka who abducted the four Vedas. The temple follows Tenkalai tradition of worship. Four daily rituals and three yearly festivals are held at the temple, of which the ten-day annual Brahmotsavam during the Tamil month of Chittirai (April - May) and the Nammalvar birth celebrations with Garudasevai with all nine temple of Nava Tirupati, being the most prominent. The temple is maintained and administered by the Hindu Religious and Endowment Board of the Government of Tamil Nadu.

Legend
As per the temple's regional legend, Somaka, an asura, defeated Brahma, the Hindu god of creation and stole the four Vedas (sacred texts) from him. Brahma was helpless and he did severe penance in the banks of Tamiraparani River seeking favour from Vishnu in the form of Devapiran. Pleased by the penance, Vishnu appeared to Brahma and promised to retrieved the Vedas. He killed the asura Somuka and restored the Vedas to Brahma. He also wished to set his abode as Srivaikuntham and resided there as Vaikunthanatha.

As per another legend, the place finds mention in the Brahmanda Purana and the Padma Purana where it is called Kedara Nilaya. Once, a sage named Suprabha wanted to perform penance and in his search for land, he ploughed at this place. He found a balance (tola) and a bow (vil), which, when he lifted, turned into a couple. The couple were cursed by Kubera once for insulting them. Since the bow and balance were redeemed to their original form, the place is called Tolavillimangalam. The sage Suprabha continued to perform penance, at the end of which, the devas received the share of offering (Havibhaga). Vishnu was pleased by the devotion of the sage and since he appeared with devas, he came to be known as Devapiram.

History

There are six inscriptions in the temple deciphered by the Archaeological Department. The inscription from a ruler named Konerimaikondan records a gift of five velis of land as a tax free gift to the temple. The temple also obtained grant for building and maintenance of a garden from a ruler who defeated the Cheras. The Pandya ruler Jatavarman Kulasekaran I (1190–1216 CE) also offered a similar grant to the temple. Maravarman Sundara Pandyan (1216–1238) made offerings to perpetual lighting of the temple. An inscription from his reign also indicates the installation of the shrine of Karunthadankanni. Vira Pandyan IV (1309–1345) offered land to the temple to perform special poojas in the temple during his birthday in the Tamil month of Vaikasi. During 1801, the temple acted as a fort for the British against the forces of Veerapandiya Kattabomman (1790–99). It is believed that the marks of war were visible in the temple during modern times. An official of the Madurai Nayak rule, Vadamalayappa Pillai arranged for the installation of Dasavathara images and Thiruvenkamudayan hall. There were also lot of offerings in jewels and kind made to the temple during his period. There were other people like Pillai Perumal, Ellarukum Nallan and Chockalingam, who made similar grants. The wooden chariot with minute sculptures were installed by Paramasivan Pillai during modern times.

Architecture

Unlike other South Indian temples, the temple does not have a rajagopuram, the temple's gateway tower. A granite wall surrounds the temple, enclosing all its shrines and two of its three bodies of water. The temple has five precincts. The sanctum houses the image of Devapiran in standing posture. The image is made of shaligrama stone and ablution is usually done with milk. The hall preceding the sanctum, the Artha Mandapam houses the festival image of Kallapiran made of panchaloha with the images of Sridevi and Bhudevi on either of his sides. It is believed that the sculptor caressed the cheeks of the image with his hand as he got enchanted by the image and it is seen in the image. The Ardha mandapa is guarded by two dvarapalas on either sides.

There are two shrines for the two consorts of Vishnu, Vaikuntha Nayaki and Chorantha Nayaki, both facing each other. There are separate shrines for Senai Mudaliyar, Garuda, Venugopala, Manavalamamunigal and Yoga Narasimha. There is another shrine that houses the images of the ten avatars of Vishnu, the Dashavataram. The Mahamandapa and the Svarga Madapa are believed to be later additions. The Dwajastamba mandap has pillars with refined architectural features. The temple maintains an elephant, which is housed in the hall close to the temple flagstaff.

Religious significance

Brahmanda Purana one of the eighteen sacred texts of Hinduism and written by Veda Vyasa contains a chapter called Navathirupathi Mahatmeeyam that describes all the nine temples of Nava Tirupati. The Devapiran temple is revered in Nalayira Divya Prabandham, the 7th–9th century Sri Vaishnava canon, one of whose authors was Nammalvar. The temple is classified as a Divya Desam, one of the 108 Vishnu temples that are mentioned in the book. The temple is also classified as a Nava Tirupati, the nine temples revered by Nammalvar located in the banks of Tamiraparani river. Nammalvar makes a reference about the temple in his works in Tiruvaymoli. During the 18th and 19th centuries, the temple finds mention in several works like 108 Tirupati Antati by Divya Kavi Pillai Perumal Aiyangar. The temple also forms a series of Navagraha temples where each of the nine planetary deities is associated with one of the Nava Tirupati temples. The temple is associated with Ketu, a snake planet.

Festival
The Garuda Sevai utsavam (festival) in the month of Vaikasi(May-Jun) witnesses nine Garudasevai, a large event in which festive images from the Nava Tirupathi shrines in the area are brought on Garuda vahana (sacred vehicle) to Alwarthirunagari Temple. An idol of Nammalvar is also brought on an Anna Vahanam (palanquin) and his pasurams (verses) dedicated to each of these 9 temples are recited. The utsavar (festival deity) of Nammalvar is taken in a palanquin to each of the nine temples, through the paddy fields in the area.  The pasurams (poems) dedicated to each of the nine Divyadesams are chanted in the respective shrines. This is the most important of the festivals in this area, and it draws thousands of visitors.

The temple follows the traditions of the Thenkalai sect of Vaishnavite tradition and follows Pancharathra aagama. The temple priests perform the pooja (rituals) during festivals and on a daily basis. As at other Vishnu temples of Tamil Nadu, the priests belong to the Vaishnava community, from the Brahmin class. The temple rituals are performed four times a day: Kalasanthi at 8:30 a.m., Uchikalam at 11:30 p.m., Sayarakshai at 6:00 p.m., and Aravanai Pooja between 8:00  - 8:00 p.m. Each ritual has three steps: alangaram (decoration), neivethanam (food offering) and deepa aradanai (waving of lamps) for both Devapiran and Karunthadankanni. During the last step of worship, nadasvaram (pipe instrument) and tavil (percussion instrument) are played, religious instructions in the Vedas (sacred text) are recited by priests, and worshippers prostrate themselves in front of the temple mast. There are weekly, monthly and fortnightly rituals performed in the temple.

See also
 Nava Tirupathi
 Aravindalochanar temple
 Irattai Thiruppathy

References

External links
 Thoothukudi District administration - Nava Tirupati

 
Hindu temples in Thoothukudi district